Blood Road is a Norwegian road. 

Blood Road may also refer to:
 Blodveien (film) (The Bload Road), a 1955 Norwegian-Yugoslav drama film
 Blood Road (film), a 2017 American documentary film
 The Blood Road, a 2018 detective novel by Logan McRae
 Blood Road Museum, a Norwegian museum